Sita Chan (10 March 1987 – 17 April 2013) was a Hong Kong Cantopop singer and actress. She began her career in 2011, and was a singer under the Sun Entertainment label. Teresa Carpio and Tak Bo Lam were her vocal tutors. Sita became a singer in 2011, and subsequently released two CDs and won several awards throughout her career.

On 17 April 2013, she died in a car accident in Yau Ma Tei, Hong Kong at the age of 26.

Biography
Chan attended singing classes and piano classes with her parents since a very young age. She attended Heep Yunn School for her secondary school education, and was involved in several singing competitions. In her secondary school, she was the member of the school's choir and fencing teams. On behalf of the participating schools' fencing competition, her team won the inter-school women's épée of the years 2003 and 2004. Moreover, she was the first runner-up in women's épée individual in 2004.

In 2005, Chan won the championship at her first singing contest. The judge then referred her to be a demo singer, and she became a part-time singer while studying at the City University of Hong Kong. She sang in public in shopping centres such as the apm and the Langham Place, as well as in banquets. From being a part-time singer, she accumulated a lot of valuable singing experience, and was appreciated by the entertainment agency. She signed an agreement with Crowning Talents as a singer in 2010. Next year, she graduated from the Department of Media and Communication of the City University of Hong Kong, obtaining a degree majoring in English for Professional Communications.

Singer career
Chan officially began her singing career in 2011, after signing a contract with Star Entertainment, and her debut song was called "Sad Remembrance" (記念悲). She has mentioned in an interview that she was brought up her career by her parents, her idols Jade Kwan and Kelly Chen. Influenced by them and her past emotional experiences, she specialized in singing sad songs. In late 2011, she won the "newcomer impact award" in the Jade Solid Gold Best Ten Music Awards Presentation.

In the beginning of 2012, Chan joined the Sun Entertainment label, and continued the record distribution contract with Star Entertainment. Under the arrangement by Paco Wong, the entertainment agency, she put her first composed song "Lethe" (忘川) to the radio. This song's music video received 2.7 million view counts on YouTube, and became a top hit on TVB's Jade Solid Gold (JSG) chart. She also won an award for this song at the first season of JSG Excellence Choice.

On 16 March 2012, Chan released her first album "Crazy Love". On 16 June 2012, she held her first music live called "Crazy Love Music Live" at Kowloonbay International Trade & Exhibition Centre, and invited famous guests of the Cantopop industry to her music live, including Hanjin Tan, Justin Lo and Jade Kwan At the same time, she started to prepare for her second album, "Let Me Find Love". In July 2012, her song "Gossip" (蜚蜚), became the first hit of her 2nd album. This song was adapted from the Korean song "시간 을 거슬러" (originally sung by ). The music video of "Gossip" was deemed successful and received 1.9 million view counts on YouTube. She subsequently sent three other songs from her second album to the radio charts. She released her second album on 19 December 2012. She was one of the few new singers in the Cantopop music industry to be able to release two albums in a year.

In March 2013, Chan represented Hong Kong at the Hong Kong Asian-Pop Music Festival, she sang her song "Gossip" to compete for the "Asian Super Star" award.

Death
On 17 April 2013, at around 2:26 am, Chan reportedly lost control of her car due to bad weather and fog on the Hoi Po Road flyover, hitting the curb before crashing into the central divider. "Let Me Find Love" was her last song sent to radio. Many Hong Kong celebrities and many Hong Kong netizens expressed their condolences via various social media platforms, including Facebook, Twitter, Weibo, Hong Kong Golden, and Discuss forums.

Mourning Activities
 17 April 2013
 Sun Entertainment issued a press release, stating that the entertainment agent Paco Wong and all staff at Sun Entertainment were shocked, sad and felt sorry about the sudden death of their singer Sita Chan, and that they will fully support and assist her family of her funeral matters. Sun Entertainment's official website also changed to grayscale tones.
 City University of Hong Kong Alumni Relations Office website had published a mourning statement.
 Heep Yunn School's official Facebook page had quoted the related news for mourning.
 18 April 2013
 Singer Jason Chan held his "Jason Chan & Friends The Next Moment Music Live" at Kowloonbay International Trade & Exhibition Centre, before the show starts, he initiated a minute of silence to mourn for Sita Chan.
 19 April 2013
 Sun Entertainment announced, in accordance with wishes of Chan's family, that it will launch her commemorative album, named "All the Best ...". The commemorative album will feature her unreleased tracks, old songs, demos, music videos, "Neway Music Live x Sita Chan" DVD of 29 December 2012, and the condolence messages from her family and friends.
 10 May 2013
 The family according to Sita's wishes, they decided to adopt the western funeral ceremony. The funeral venue was decorated with the colours of pink and white. The choir of her alma mater Heep Yunn School also presented psalm singing. Her funeral was scheduled on 10 May 2013, at the Po Fook Memorial Hall in Tai Wai.
 Sun Entertainment released her music videos of her new songs, including "The Script of Love" (愛的劇本), "Love Me Not" (不愛我)...etc.
 11 May 2013
 On the day of funeral, Chan was sent to the Fu Shan Crematorium for cremation.
 15 May 2013
 Sita's commemorate album "All the Best ..." was scheduled to be released on that day.

Discography

Albums

Composed Tracks
 Lethe (忘川), Roller Coaster (過山車 – Mandarin version), BeLIEve (English version)
 Backup (後備), Lover No. 2 (第二愛人 – Mandarin version)
 Want to say I Love You (想講一聲我愛你)

Unreleased Tracks
 Other Than Sorry (除了對不起) – 2011
 BeLIEve (Lethe's English version) – 2012
 Want To Say I Love You (想講一聲我愛你) – 2013

Chart Standings

Legend: 
 An asterisk denotes the song is still on the chart.

Filmography

Dramas
 Love Love Love (戀 Love Love) – 2011
 How Long can Love Last (愛可以多狗) – 2012

Movies
 Lan Kwai Fong 2 (喜愛夜蒲2) – 2012
 Love in Time (等我愛你) as Mo Kiu (毛嬌) – 2012

Mini-Movie
 Cheese Cake mini-movie – 2013

Awards

References

1987 births
2013 deaths
21st-century Hong Kong women singers
Hong Kong film actresses
Cantopop singers
Road incident deaths in Hong Kong
Alumni of the City University of Hong Kong